American pop rock band Haim has released three studio albums, five extended plays, 17 singles (plus 5 as a featured artist), six promotional singles, and 17 music videos. The band, which consists of three sisters Este, Danielle and Alana Haim, and drummer Dash Hutton, began performing together in 2007 and became a full-time band in 2012. The group's first release, Forever (an EP released on a limited-time download), combined with positive reception at the South by Southwest festival, led to a deal with Polydor Records and a management deal with Jay Z's Roc Nation group in mid-2012.

Haim released their debut studio album, Days Are Gone, in September 2013. The album reached number one on the UK Albums Chart and has since sold over 300,244 copies in the United Kingdom. The band has released six singles from the album: "Forever", "Don't Save Me", "Falling", "The Wire", "If I Could Change Your Mind", "My Song 5", with "The Wire" reaching number 16 on the UK Singles Chart.

Studio albums

Extended plays

Singles

As lead artist

As featured artist

Promotional singles

Other charted songs

Guest appearances

Remixes

Music videos

Notes

References

External links
 
 

Discography
Discographies of American artists
Rock music discographies